Aleksandr Viktorovich Kulagin (born 29 June 1954) is a retired Russian rower who had his best achievements in the coxless fours, together with Valeriy Dolinin, Aleksey Kamkin and Vitaly Eliseyev. In this event they won a world title in 1981 and silver medals at the 1980 Summer Olympics and 1982 World Rowing Championships. Kulagin and Eliseev also won a world title in the coxless pairs in 1977.

After retiring from competitions Kulagin worked as a rowing coach, training Mikhail Belikov, Merab Chermashentsev and Aleksandr Bogdashin.

References

External links
 
 
 

1954 births
Living people
Russian male rowers
Soviet male rowers
Olympic rowers of the Soviet Union
Olympic silver medalists for the Soviet Union
Olympic medalists in rowing
Rowers at the 1980 Summer Olympics
Medalists at the 1980 Summer Olympics
World Rowing Championships medalists for the Soviet Union